Hakaru (written:  or ) is a masculine Japanese given name. Notable people with the name include:

, Japanese physician
, Japanese metallurgist
, Japanese leper hospital manager

See also
Hakaru River, a river in New Zealand

Japanese masculine given names